is a 1979 Japanese film directed by Sadao Nakajima. The film deals with Sanada Yukimura and the Siege of Osaka.

Cast
Hiroki Matsukata as Sanada Yukimura
Chiezō Kataoka as Sanada Masayuki
Tatsuo Umemiya as Sanada Nobuyuki
Teruhiko Aoi as Sarutobi Sasuke
Guts Ishimatsu  as Unno Rokurō
Minori Terada as Kirigakure Saizō
Kensaku Morita as Kakei Juzō
Shōhei Hino as Anayama Kosuke
Hiroyuki Sanada as Miyoshi Isa
Nobuo Kaneko as Hayashi Razan
Akiji Kobayashi as Honda Masazumi
Seizō Fukumoto as Hayakaze
Junichi Haruta as Akagumo
Ryosuke Kagawa as Tenkai
Rokkō Toura as Ono Harunaga
Ichiro Ogura as Toyotomi Hideyori
Mieko Takamine as Lady Yodo
Mikio Narita as Katō Kiyomasa
Tetsuro Tamba as Goto Matabei
Kinnosuke Yorozuya (Special appearance) as Tokugawa Ieyasu

References

Jidaigeki films
Samurai films
Cultural depictions of Sanada clan
Cultural depictions of Tokugawa Ieyasu
1970s Japanese films